"There You Go Again" is a song recorded by American country music artist Kenny Rogers.  It was released in January 2001 as the second single and title track from the album There You Go Again.  The song reached #26 on the Billboard Hot Country Singles & Tracks chart.  The song was written by Terry McBride, Jennifer Kimball and Tommy Lee James.

Chart performance

References

2001 singles
2000 songs
Kenny Rogers songs
Songs written by Tommy Lee James
Songs written by Jennifer Kimball
Songs written by Terry McBride (musician)